Spokane Community College is a public community college in Spokane, Washington.  It is part of the Community Colleges of Spokane and was established in 1963.

Academics
SCC offers associate degree, bachelor's degrees, and certificates. SCC's health sciences division is the largest among community and technical colleges in Washington state.  The college is accredited by the Northwest Commission on Colleges and Universities.

Campus

SCC's campus of 23 administrative, academic and support buildings is located on  next to the Spokane River in Spokane's Chief Garry Park neighborhood. An additional  is used for off-campus facilities, including an Apprenticeship and Journeyman Training Center and Felts Field aviation hangar. In 2012–2013, the community colleges' Institute for Extended Learning merged with SCC, expanding its program offerings to include adult basic education, e.g., GED, ESL, High School Completion; Career Transitions; ACT 2 (continuing education for adult 50 and older; parent education and co-operative pre-schools; and rural education centers in Colville, Inchelium, Ione, Newport, and Republic.

Athletics
SFCC partners with Spokane Community College as the Community Colleges of Spokane, using the team name the Sasquatch. They compete in the Northwest Athletic Conference (NWAC). The official colors are blue and gold.

Sports offered:
Men's: basketball, baseball, soccer.
Women's: volleyball, basketball, soccer, softball.
Both: golf, track and field athletics (indoor and outdoor), cross country, tennis

Notable alumni
Amy Doneen, Doctor of Nursing practice and cofounder of the BaleDoneen Method.
Julianna Pena, winner of The Ultimate Fighter: Team Rousey vs. Team Tate, current UFC Women's Bantamweight Champion.

See also 
Spokane Community College Transit Center

References

External links

Community colleges in Washington (state)
Universities and colleges in Spokane, Washington
Universities and colleges accredited by the Northwest Commission on Colleges and Universities
Educational institutions established in 1963
1963 establishments in Washington (state)